Ningxian may refer to:

Ningbo, formerly also known as Ningxian, city in Zhejiang, China
Ning County, pinyin Ningxian, county in Gansu, China